The 4 September 2007 Rawalpindi bombings refer to the incident on 4 September 2007 in which suicide bombers attacked a bus carrying Government workers exploded in a commercial district of Rawalpindi. It is estimated to have killed 25 people and injured 68. Police have increased security within the nearby Pakistani capital of Islamabad.

Events
The bombs exploded after 7:20 am near the army General Headquarters and other top military sites. One attack was aimed at Defence Ministry bus picking up army staff passengers and an explosive laden motorcycle caused the second attack, near a market.

Bus attack
At 7:20 am, the front of a bus carrying army staff passengers exploded, blowing off the roof and destroying all but the rearmost seats. Although Interior Ministry spokesman Javed Iqbal Cheema referred to the attack as a suicide bombing, a local police officer believes the bomb may have been previously planted.

Motorcycle
Approximately fifteen minutes after the first blast, a suicide bomber crashed a motorcycle into nearby vehicles, killing at least one colonel.

Suspects
Preliminary investigations concerning the September 2007 bombings in Rawalpindi note that the Taliban figure Baitullah Mehsud is the primary suspect behind the attacks.

References

2007 murders in Pakistan
21st-century mass murder in Pakistan
Suicide bombings in Pakistan
Terrorist incidents in Pakistan in 2007
Mass murder in 2007
Terrorist incidents in Rawalpindi